Jombozeh or Jombezeh may refer to:
 Jombozeh, Isfahan
 Jombozeh, Dehaqan, Isfahan Province